Warburgia elongata is a species of plant in the family Canellaceae. It is endemic to Tanzania.

References

Canellaceae
Endemic flora of Tanzania
Taxonomy articles created by Polbot